Hoseynabad (also Romanized as Ḩoseynābād) is a village in Hasanabad Rural District, in the Central District of Ravansar County, Kermanshah Province, Iran. At the 2006 census, its population was 29, in 6 families.

References 

Populated places in Ravansar County